The 2017 AFC Champions League Final was the final of the 2017 AFC Champions League, the 36th edition of the top-level Asian club football tournament organized by the Asian Football Confederation (AFC), and the 15th under the current AFC Champions League title.

The final was contested in two-legged home-and-away format between Saudi Arabian team Al-Hilal and Japanese team Urawa Red Diamonds. This was the first AFC Champions League final involving a Japanese club since Gamba Osaka in 2008. The first leg was hosted by Al-Hilal at the King Fahd International Stadium in Riyadh on 18 November 2017, while the second leg was hosted by Urawa Red Diamonds at the Saitama Stadium 2002 in Saitama on 25 November 2017. The winner earned the right to represent the AFC at the 2017 FIFA Club World Cup, entering at the second round.

After the first leg ended in a 1–1 draw, Urawa Red Diamonds defeated Al-Hilal 1–0 in the second leg to win 2–1 on aggregate, and were crowned AFC Champions League champions for the second time.

Teams
In the following table, finals until 2002 were in the Asian Club Championship era, since 2003 were in the AFC Champions League era.

Notes

Venues

This was the fourth time that an Asian club final was played in the King Fahd International Stadium, with the previous finals being 1995, 2000, and 2014 (second leg).

This was the second time that an Asian club final was played in the Saitama Stadium 2002, with the previous final being 2007 (second leg).

Road to the final

Note: In all results below, the score of the finalist is given first (H: home; A: away).

Format
The final was played on a home-and-away two-legged basis, with the order of legs (first leg hosted by team from the West Region, second leg hosted by team from the East Region) reversed from the previous season's final. The away goals rule, extra time (away goals do not apply in extra time) and penalty shoot-out would be used to decide the winner if necessary (Regulations, Section 3. 11.2 & 11.3).

Matches

First leg
Urawa Red Diamonds took the lead in the seventh minute after Rafael Silva intercepted a clearance of Salman Al-Faraj and converted from close range.	
Omar Kharbin scored for Al-Hilal in the 37th minute striking a close-range effort through the legs of Urawa Red Diamonds goalkeeper Shusaku Nishikawa.

Second leg
Carlos Eduardo (Al-Hilal) tore the anterior cruciate ligament in his left knee during first leg and was ruled out from second leg.
Urawa Red Diamonds scored the only goal in the 88th minute when Rafael Silva scored from the right of the penalty area, shooting high to the net with his right foot.

See also
2017 AFC Cup Final

References

External links
, the-AFC.com
AFC Champions League 2017, stats.the-AFC.com

2017
Final
November 2017 sports events in Asia
International club association football competitions hosted by Saudi Arabia
International club association football competitions hosted by Japan
Al Hilal SFC matches
Urawa Red Diamonds matches